Gissing is a surname. Notable people with the surname include:

 Alfred Gissing (1896–1975), English writer and headmaster
 Algernon Gissing (1860–1937), English writer
 George Gissing (1857–1903), English novelist
 Harry Gissing (1890–1963), American track and field athlete
 Jason Gissing (born 1970), British businessman

See also
 Gissing, Norfolk, a village and civil parish in England
 Gissing v. Gissing, a case in English property law